Tyler Jordan Harvey (born July 17, 1993) is an American professional basketball player for the Illawarra Hawks of the Australian National Basketball League (NBL). He played college basketball for the Eastern Washington Eagles, where he led Division I in scoring as a junior. He primarily plays the point guard and shooting guard positions. Harvey graduated from Bishop Montgomery High School of Torrance, California, in 2011.

College career
According to Eagles head coach Jim Hayford, Harvey was the player the team was "building their basketball program on" as a sophomore.

As a junior, Harvey led Eastern Washington to Division I school-record 26 wins and a share of the Big Sky Conference regular season title, the Big Sky tournament title, and a spot in the 2015 NCAA Tournament. The Eagles received a thirteen seed and played fourth seed Georgetown in the second round of the tournament. The Eagles fell to the Hoyas, 74–84, ending their season.

Harvey finished the season as the Division I national scoring leader at 23.1 points per game. Harvey also led the nation in three-point shots made as well. Harvey would earn Honorable Mention All-American honors by the Associated Press, the first Eastern Washington player to do so since Rodney Stuckey in 2007. Harvey would be named to the Big Sky Conference first-team for the second-straight year. He was also named a first-team Academic All-American, and was also named to the Lou Henson Mid-Major All-American Team.

On April 1, 2015, Harvey announced his decision to forgo his final season at Eastern Washington and declared for the 2015 NBA draft.

Professional career

Erie BayHawks (2015)
On June 25, 2015, Harvey was selected with the 51st overall pick in the 2015 NBA draft by the Orlando Magic. He later joined the Magic blue team for the 2015 NBA Summer League. On October 31, 2015, he was acquired by the Erie BayHawks of the NBA Development League, the affiliate team of the Magic. On November 20, he made his professional debut in a 103–93 loss to the Delaware 87ers, recording 9 points, 1 rebounds, two assists and two steals in 29 minutes. On December 30, the Bayhawks trailed by 21 points with 4 minutes and 23 seconds. Over those 4 minutes and 23 seconds, Harvey proceeded to sink six straight threes, teaming with fellow guard John Jordan to send the game to overtime. The Bayhawks ended up winning the game, 125–120.

Auxilium Pallacanestro Torino (2016–2017)
On July 22, 2016, Harvey signed with FIAT Torino of the Italian Serie A.

Olympique Antibes (2017–2018)
On August 16, 2017, Harvey signed with Olympique Antibes of LNB Pro A.

Memphis Hustle (2018–2019)
On July 23, 2018, the Magic traded Harvey's NBA rights, alongside Dakari Johnson to the Memphis Grizzlies for Jarell Martin and cash considerations. For the 2018–19 season, Harvey was added to the roster of the Grizzlies’ G League affiliate, the Memphis Hustle. On February 2, 2019 Harvey converted 13 3-point shots, tying the NBA G League single-game record established by Brady Heslip on November 29, 2014 that continued to stand .

Ratiopharm Ulm (2019–2020)
On July 19, 2019, Harvey signed with Ratiopharm Ulm of the Basketball Bundesliga.

Illawarra Hawks (2020–present)
On July 28, 2020, Harvey signed a one-year deal with the Illawarra Hawks of the Australian National Basketball League (NBL). He averaged 20.4 points, 3.7 rebounds, 3.2 assists and 1.4 steals per game during the 2020–21 season while shooting 38% from beyond the three-point line. He was subsequently named to the All-NBL First Team.

On July 9, 2021, Harvey re-signed with the Hawks on a three-year deal.

Draft rights
On June 25, 2015, Harvey was selected with the 51st overall pick in the 2015 NBA draft by the Orlando Magic.

On July 23, 2018, the Magic traded Harvey's NBA rights, alongside Dakari Johnson to the Memphis Grizzlies for Jarell Martin and cash considerations.

On August 7, 2021, Harvey's NBA rights was traded to the Charlotte Hornets.

See also
 List of NCAA Division I men's basketball season scoring leaders
 List of NCAA Division I men's basketball season 3-point field goal leaders

References

External links
RealGM profile
Eastern Washington Eagles bio

1993 births
Living people
African-American basketball players
American expatriate basketball people in Australia
American expatriate basketball people in France
American expatriate basketball people in Germany
American expatriate basketball people in Italy
American men's basketball players
Basketball players from Torrance, California
Eastern Washington Eagles men's basketball players
Erie BayHawks (2008–2017) players
Lega Basket Serie A players
Memphis Hustle players
Olympique Antibes basketball players
Orlando Magic draft picks
Point guards
Ratiopharm Ulm players
Shooting guards
Illawarra Hawks players
21st-century African-American sportspeople